Souled and Healed is the 2005 comeback album from Jim Diamond, his first studio album since 1994's Sugarolly Days.  He would promote this album in the UK and Europe intermittently with saxophone player Snake Davis as The Blue Shoes.

Track listing
"This is America"  4.40 (Diamond, Birchall)
"Blue Shoes"  4.06 (Diamond, Birchall)
"When You Turn"  4.25 (Diamond, Birchall, Davis)
"When You Lose Yourself"  4.30 (Diamond, Birchall, Davis)
"Loving You Is Sweeter Than Ever"  3.47 (Stevie Wonder, Ivy Jo Hunter)
"A Million Miles"  4.34 (Diamond, Birchall)
"Nothing Sweeter"  4.18 (Diamond, Birchall)
"Rhythm of the Radio"  3.54 (Diamond, Birchall, Davis)
"Strangers"  3.58 (Diamond, Birchall, Davis)
"The Last Time"  3.32 (Diamond, Birchall)

2005 albums
Jim Diamond (singer) albums